Gmina Rejowiec Fabryczny is a rural gmina (administrative district) in Chełm County, Lublin Voivodeship, in eastern Poland. Its seat is the town of Rejowiec Fabryczny, although the town is not part of the territory of the gmina.

Villages
Gmina Rejowiec Fabryczny contains the villages and settlements of Gołąb, Józefin, Kanie-Stacja, Krasne, Krzywowola, Leszczanka, Liszno, Liszno-Kolonia, Pawłów, Toruń, Wólka Kańska, Wólka Kańska-Kolonia, Zalesie Kańskie and Zalesie Krasieńskie.

Neighbouring gminas
Gmina Rejowiec Fabryczny is bordered by the town of Rejowiec Fabryczny and by the gminas of Łopiennik Górny, Rejowiec, Siedliszcze and Trawniki.

References
Polish official population figures 2006

Gminas in Lublin Voivodeship
Chełm County